Doljin Demberel (born 19 May 1938) is a Mongolian archer who competed in the 1972 Summer Olympic Games in archery.

Olympics 

Demberel finished 36th in the women's individual event with a score of 2152 points.

References

External links
 
 Profile on worldarchery.org

1935 births
Living people
Mongolian female archers
Olympic archers of Mongolia
Archers at the 1972 Summer Olympics
20th-century Mongolian women